The Cumbria Police and Crime Commissioner is the police and crime commissioner, an elected official tasked with setting out the way crime is tackled by Cumbria Police in the English ceremonial county of Cumbria. The post was created in November 2012, following an election held on 15 November 2012, and replaced the Cumbria Police Authority. Richard Rhodes was the first Cumbria Police and Crime Commissioner.

The current incumbent is Peter McCall, who represents the Conservative Party.

List of Cumbria Police and Crime Commissioners

References

Police and crime commissioners in England